The men's 10 km race at the 2005 World Championships occurred on July 20.

Results

Key: DNS = Did not start

References
Worlds 2005 results: Men's 10 km, from OmegaTiming.com (official timer of the 2005 Worlds); retrieved 2010-01-25.

Open water swimming at the 2005 World Aquatics Championships
World Aquatics Championships